Between 20 September 2012 and 22 March 2017, 191 representatives filled the 150 seats of the House of Representatives, the lower house of the States-General of the Netherlands. Anouchka van Miltenburg was elected Speaker of the House of Representatives for this period.

The members were elected at the general election of 15 March 2017. After the election, the Second Rutte cabinet was formed for this term, consisting of People's Party for Freedom and Democracy (VVD, 41 seats) and Labour Party (PvdA, 28 seats). The opposition consisted of Party for Freedom (PVV, 15 seats), Socialist Party (SP, 15 seats), Christian Democratic Appeal (CDA, 13 seats), Democrats 66 (D66, 12 seats), Christian Union (CU, 5 seats), GroenLinks (GL, 4 seats), Reformed Political Party (SGP, 3 seats), Party for the Animals (PvdD, 2 seats) and 50PLUS (50+, 2 seats).

43 members (temporarily) left the House of Representatives during this term, mostly for personal reasons (15) or to join the cabinet (13). Replacements were supplied from their party lists, so the resignation of individual members did not change the balance of power in the House of Representatives.

Members

Notes

References 

 

2012-2017